Gunwi O clan was one of the Korean clans. Their Bon-gwan was in Gunwi County, North Gyeongsang Province. According to the research in 2015, the number of Gunwi O clan was 26949. Their founder was O Suk-gwi, the governor of Gunwi County during the era of Goryeo dynasty. He was the son of O Hyeon-jwa who was the governor of Dongbok County and founder of Dongbok O clan.

References